Nevesinli Salih Pasha (died 16 September 1647) was an Ottoman civil servant and grand vizier.

Early years
Salih Pasha was from Nevesinje, Sanjak of Herzegovina, Bosnia Eyalet, and was sent to Constantinople at a young age. During the reign of Sultan Murat IV (r. 1623–1640), he was a civil servant specialized in treasury. He served in some other posts as well, and finally during the reign of Sultan Ibrahim (r. 1640–1648) in 1644, he was appointed defterdar, the highest position in the treasury. In 1645, grand vizier Sultanzade Mehmet Pasha was dismissed from the post. The first choice of the sultan for the post was Yusuf Pasha. However, Yusuf Pasha did not accept, and Salih Pasha was appointed as grand vizier on 17 December 1645.

Grand Vizierate
The most important issue in 1646 was the war in Crete, an important island in the Aegean Sea, which was a dependency of Republic of Venice in the first half of the 17th century (see Cretan War (1645–1669)). Salih Pasha sent Sultanzade Mehmet Pasha, his predecessor, to Crete as the general commander. When Mehmet Pasha died soon afterwards, Gazi Hüseyin Pasha was appointed the next commander. He was successful in capturing Rethymno. Another mainstream issue at the time was the disobedience of the Mingrelia (also known as Samegrelo, in western Georgia) principality, which was a vassal state of the Ottoman Empire. Salih Pasha was able to maintain order there.

Death
According to Austrian orientalist Joseph von Hammer-Purgstall, Sultan Ibrahim, an unbalanced monarch, had given strict orders to ban any horse carts in Istanbul, the capital. Seeing that his order was violated, he ordered the execution of his grand vizier, Salih Pasha. During a divan meeting, Salih Pasha was arrested and executed on 16 September 1647.

See also
List of Ottoman Grand Viziers

References

Pashas
17th-century Grand Viziers of the Ottoman Empire
1647 deaths
Defterdar
Devshirme
Executed people from the Ottoman Empire
People from Nevesinje
People from the Ottoman Empire of Bosnian descent
Executed Bosnia and Herzegovina people
17th-century executions by the Ottoman Empire
Year of birth unknown